Polycauliona comandorica is a species of fruticulose (minutely shrubby) lichen in the family Teloschistaceae. It was formally described as a new species in 2021 by Dmitry Himelbrant, Irina Stepanchikova, and Ivan Frolov.

The lichen is found in the splash zone of the Commander Islands in the Russian Far East; its specific epithet comandorica refers to its type locality. The type specimen was collected on Medny Island, under a colony of horned puffins. A close association with seabird colonies is common to all of the known localities of this lichen species. Several secondary compounds have been detected in the lichen, including parietin as a major compound, and minor to trace amounts of parietinic acid, emodin, citreorosein, emodinal, emodic acid, fallacinal, and teloschistin.

The fruticulose growth form is rather rare in the Teloschistaceae, with about a dozen examples known in the family of about one thousand species. P. comandorica is somewhat similar in morphology to P. thamnodes; it is distinguished by its lighter yellow to grey thallus, its rougher, longer and thicker branches; its soredia and blastidia; and in the absence of apothecia.

References

Teloschistales
Lichen species
Lichens described in 2021
Lichens of the Russian Far East